The Dr. J. T. Tenny House in Alma, Wisconsin, United States, is a Queen Anne style house built in 1904 by local builders Ulrich and Anton Walser.  It was listed on the National Register of Historic Places in 1982.

Ulrich Walser and/or his brother Anton built most of the frame houses in Alma that have Queen Anne style elements.

References

Houses completed in 1904
Houses in Buffalo County, Wisconsin
Houses on the National Register of Historic Places in Wisconsin
Queen Anne architecture in Wisconsin
National Register of Historic Places in Buffalo County, Wisconsin